Blauwhuis is a village in Súdwest-Fryslân municipality in the province of Friesland, the Netherlands. It had a population of around 585 in January 2017.

History
The village was first mentioned in 1718 as 't Blauw Huys, and means "blue houses" after the tiles of the polder office who had been responsible for the 1622 poldering of the lake Sensmeer. In 1651, a priest was in charge of the polder house and started to invite other Catholics to the area, and developed into a Catholic enclave during the 18th century.

Blauwhuis was home to 151 people in 1840. The Catholic St Vitus Church was built between 1868 and 1871 and was designed by Pierre Cuypers. The church replaced a clandestine church in a barn. In 1950, it was awarded village status. Before 2011, the village was part of the Wymbritseradiel municipality.

Gallery

References

Súdwest-Fryslân
Populated places in Friesland